Richard Townsend "Richie/Ritchie" Gun  (born 27 May 1936) is a retired politician and doctor.

Born in Adelaide, South Australia, he was educated at St Peter's College and the University of Adelaide. He was on the anaesthetics registrar at the Royal Adelaide Hospital.

Political career
In 1969 he was elected to the Australian House of Representatives as the Labor member for Kingston, defeating Liberal MP Kay Brownbill. He held the seat until 1975, when he was defeated by the Liberal candidate, Grant Chapman, with a swing of over 12 percent.  He unsuccessfully attempted to retake the seat at the next two elections, the second time losing by only 358 votes.

Medical career

Gun began his work in occupational medicine in the 1970s. He was one of the founding members of the College of Occupational Medicine, now known as the Australasian Faculty of Occupational Medicine.

In 1983 Gun was appointed chair of the Commonwealth Government's Interim National Occupational Health and Safety Commission. The Minister for Employment and Industrial Relations (Ralph Willis) quoted his qualifications as: 
"a medical practitioner who is currently a Visiting Scientist with the United States National Institute for Occupational Safety and Health. From his previous position as a Senior Medical Officer in the Occupational Health Branch of the South Australian Health Commission, Dr Gun has a long involvement with, and knowledge of, occupational health in Australia. This, together with his relevant international experience, will bring to the Interim National Commission a most valuable contribution."

In 1990 when he was a senior lecturer in occupational and environmental health at the University of Adelaide he published the results of a study which suggested that the incidence of repetitive strain injury (RSI) was declining in South Australia.

Honours and awards
In 2015 Gun was appointed an Officer of the Order of Australia "for distinguished service to medicine, particularly in the field of occupational health and safety, and to socially disadvantaged communities in regional Australia and Timor-Leste".

References

1936 births
Living people
Australian Labor Party members of the Parliament of Australia
Members of the Australian House of Representatives for Kingston
Members of the Australian House of Representatives
Officers of the Order of Australia
People educated at St Peter's College, Adelaide
20th-century Australian politicians